Umm Waraqah bint 'Abd Allah b. Al-harith, was a contemporary of Islamic prophet Muhammad. The example of Umm Waraqah is based on a Hadith which has been graded Hasan (Acceptable) by Shaykh Al Albani.The hadith also refutes the argument made by Imam Nawawi as it states that the Muezzin was an old man who prayed behind her so she did lead men in prayer.

Because of the strength of the evidence, the example of Umm Waraqah serves as the basis for the opinion among some Islamic jurists that women are permitted to not only lead other women in prayer, but that they may also lead mixed-sex congregations under the circumstance that she leads from behind the male congregation, does not beautify her voice, and that there is no man available with any knowledge of the Quran, and that she leads them in a nafl (optional) prayer not a fardh (mandatory) prayer. This is for instance a minority opinion in the Hanbali tradition. The Hanbali tradition does not take the hadith of Umm Waraqah as daleel (proof used while drawing a conclusion from Islamic law), because Umm Waraqah did not have any men in her household to lead in prayer. Imam Nawawi, a prolific scholar of hadith and fiqh, writes regarding this hadith in his book Majmoo' "It is a matter of agreement amongst scholars who even rejected the Hadeeth of Umm Waraqah because it is weak, and those who deemed it authentic said the ones she led were women not men" To deviate from how a hadith was understood by the salaf and ulema of previous generations would be to invent a new meaning which was never intended by that hadith.

Because Umm Waraqah was one of very few people to have memorized the entire Qur'an, she was one of its few oral transmitters before it was recorded in writing.

Umm Waraqah also presents a unique challenge to the notion of Jihad as a violent struggle or Holy War. Instead, The Prophet, according to Ibn Sa'd's narrative, denoted her "the Martyred Woman" (al-Shahida) even though he did not allow her to accompany him into battle during the Battle of Badr. Instead, Umm Waraqah's gateway to martyrdom was her faithful struggle in continuing to lead prayer in her household. It was during this that she achieved martyrdom, when, "two servants, a male and a female who were under her charge, murdered her during 'Umar's Caliphate and fled."

References

Women companions of the Prophet